Ekiti East is a Local Government Area of Ekiti State, Nigeria. Its headquarters are in the town of Omuo Ekiti. Ekiti East Local Government Area falls within the Southern Senatorial zone of Ekiti State otherwise known as Ekiti South Senatorial District alongside Ekiti South-West, Ikere, Emure, Ise/Orun and Gbonyin local government areas. Ekiti East Local Government Area also forms a Federal Constituency alongside Emure and Gbonyin Local Government Areas.

It has an area of 1,072 km and a population of 137,955 at the 2006 census. The local government area is bounded to the north by Kogi State, to the east by Ondo State, to the south by Gbonyin local government area, and to the west by Ikole Ekiti local government area.

The postal code of the area is 370.

See also
 Omuo

References

Local Government Areas in Ekiti State